The Cherry Blossom Ten Mile Run is an annual 10-mile (16 km) road race in Washington, D.C. Founded in 1973 originally as a precursor training run for elite runners planning to compete in the Boston Marathon, the race has evolved over the years into a local race for runners of all abilities. Nevertheless, it still attracts international running stars such as Catherine Ndereba, Bill Rodgers, John Korir, and Olga Romanova.

The race is scheduled for the first Sunday of each April, meant to coincide with the bloom of the cherry blossoms given as a gift in 1912 from the mayor of Tokyo. The race is part of the National Cherry Blossom Festival of late March and early April in the city.

The race course covers many historic and memorable sights in Washington, D.C. Among the landmarks along the route are the Jefferson Memorial, the Franklin Delano Roosevelt Memorial, the Washington Monument, Arlington National Cemetery, the Lincoln Memorial, the Watergate complex, Rock Creek Park, and the Tidal Basin.

The 2020 in-person edition of the race was cancelled due to the coronavirus pandemic, with all registrants given the option of obtaining a guaranteed non-complimentary entry for 2021 or a full refund.  A virtual race was also organized, free and open to all registrants of the cancelled race.

Winners 
Key:
  Course record (in bold)
  Virtual race

Notes

References

List of winners
Leydig, Jeck (2011-04-04). Cherry Blossom 10 mile. Association of Road Racing Statisticians. Retrieved on 2011-10-14.

External links
Credit Union Cherry Blossom Ten Mile Run

10-mile runs
Road running competitions in Washington, D.C.
Recurring sporting events established in 1973